The following lists events that happened during 1862 in New Zealand.

Incumbents

Regal and viceregal
Head of State – Queen Victoria
Governor – Sir George Grey

Government and law
The 3rd Parliament continues.

Speaker of the House – David Monro
Premier – Alfred Domett replaces William Fox on 6 August after Fox loses a vote of no-confidence.
Minister of Finance – Reader Wood loses the post on 6 August with the fall of the Fox government, and is replaced by Dillon Bell, but is reappointed just 15 days later on 21 August.
Chief Justice – Hon Sir George Arney (he is knighted during the year)

Events
27 January – The Auckland Register, which started in 1857, ceases publication.
 1 July – The first telegraph transmission in New Zealand is made from Lyttelton Post Office to Christchurch.
 7 July – Parliament meets in Wellington for the first time. (see also 1863; 1865)
 15 August – Horatio Hartley and Christopher Reilly arrive in Dunedin with 87 pounds of gold from the banks of the Clutha river in Cromwell George leading to the Dunstan Gold Rush. 
 12 November – The Invercargill Times publishes its first issue. It changed its name to The Southland Times two years later, and became a daily in 1875. It continues to publish .
 Otago Gold Rush (1861–63)

Undated
The Nelson Intelligence is a short-lived newspaper in the Nelson, New Zealand area.

Sport

Cricket
The second inter-provincial game is played. Nelson defeat Wellington.

Horse racing

Major race winner
New Zealand Derby – Emmeline

Lawn bowls
The Auckland club is now playing on its own green.

Rowing
1 January – The first recorded rowing regatta takes place on Lyttelton Harbour.

Later in the year the Canterbury Rowing Club is formed to row on the Avon River in Christchurch.

Shooting
Ballinger Belt – Private Holt (Nelson)

Births

 15 June: George Helmore, rugby union player
 21 October: John Findlay, politician

Unknown date

 Albert Pitt, politician
 (in Australia) Charles Kendall Wilson, politician.

Deaths

 16 May: Edward Gibbon Wakefield, a driving force behind New Zealand's colonisation
 5 June: Charles Kettle, surveyor of Dunedin
 October: Iwikau Te Heuheu Tukino III, tribal leader

See also
List of years in New Zealand
Timeline of New Zealand history
History of New Zealand
Military history of New Zealand
Timeline of the New Zealand environment
Timeline of New Zealand's links with Antarctica

References
General
 Romanos, J. (2001) New Zealand Sporting Records and Lists. Auckland: Hodder Moa Beckett. 
Specific

External links